NGC 207 is a spiral galaxy roughly 178 million light-years from the Solar System in the constellation Cetus. It was discovered on December 7, 1857, by R. J. Mitchell.

See also 
 List of NGC objects (1–1000)

References

External links 
  
 SEDS

0207
Cetus (constellation)
2395
Astronomical objects discovered in 1857
Galaxies discovered in 1857